Acar is a genus of small saltwater clams, marine bivalve mollusks in the family Arcidae, the ark clams.

Some authors consider it to be a subgenus of Barbatia.

Species 
Species in this genus include:
Acar abdita P. G. Oliver & Chesney, 1994
Acar agulhasensis (Thiele, 1931)
Acar bailyi Bartsch, 1931
Acar botanica (Hedley, 1917)
Acar carditaeformis (Dautzenberg & H. Fischer, 1897)
Acar clathrata (Defrance, 1816)
Acar congenita (E. A. Smith, 1885)
Acar decorata (Hayami & Kase, 1993)
Acar dubia (Baird, 1873)
Acar gradata (Broderip & G. B. Sowerby I, 1829), from California, US
Acar lepidoformis Francisco, Barros & S. Lima, 2012
Acar marsupialis P. G. Oliver & Holmes, 2004
Acar naturezae Francisco, Barros & S. Lima, 2012
Acar oliveirae Francisco, Barros & S. Lima, 2012
Acar olivercoseli M. Huber, 2010
Acar petasion (Kilburn, 1983)
Acar plicata (Dillwyn, 1817)
Acar pusilla (G. B. Sowerby I, 1833)
Acar requiescens (Melvill & Standen, 1907)
Acar rostae (Berry, 1954)
Acar sandersonae Powell, 1933
Acar sociella (Brookes, 1926)
Acar squamosa (Lamarck, 1819)
Acar transmar Simone, 2009, from Brazil

Although Simone lists another species Acar domingensis, it has been reclassified as Barbatia.

References

Arcidae
Bivalve genera
Taxa named by John Edward Gray